Yemen (Middle Persian: Yaman) was a province of the Sasanian Empire in Late Antiquity in southwestern Arabia.

History
Yemen was conquered in 570 by a small expeditionary aswaran force led by the Sasanian veteran Vahrez−the Himyarite prince Sayf ibn Dhi-Yazan was then appointed as a vassal king of the Sasanians in the country, whilst Vahrez went back to the Sasanian capital of Ctesiphon. One of the main reasons behind the Sasanian conquest was due to their interest in dominating the trade route from Constantinople to India and the Far East, which was now possible with their authority established in Yemen.

However, in 575 or 578, Sayf was killed by the Ethiopians during an uprising, which forced Vahrez to return to Yemen with a force of 4,000 men, and expel the Ethiopians once again. He then installed Sayf's son Ma'di Karib as the new king of Yemen. A large Iranian garrison was this time established in Yemen, with Vahrez as its governor. The Iranian soldiers and bureaucrats started intermarrying with the local population; their offspring became known as the al-Abna' ("the sons"). It is uncertain whether they kept practicing Zoroastrianism, or had been influenced by the South Arabian paganism and the local Christianity. According to al-Tabari, Vahrez's successors were; his son Marzban; his grandson Binagar; his great-grandson Khurrah Khosrow; and then a certain Badhan, who was unrelated to the family of Vahrez.

After the overthrow and death of the last prominent Sasanian king (shah) Khosrow II in 628, the Iranian nobles of Yemen made an alliance with the Islamic prophet Muhammad, and thus the country became part of the Islamic political structure. The abna' retained their distinct identity during the Islamic period, but was gradually absorbed into the local population and thus disappeared from records. Their nisba was al-Abnāwī.

List of governors

See also
Bahram Gushnasp

References

Sources
 
 
 

Yemen
570 establishments
7th century in Yemen
States and territories established in the 6th century
States and territories disestablished in the 7th century
Ancient history of Yemen